Bayshore Blufflands State Natural Area is a Wisconsin Department of Natural Resources-designated State Natural Area of significant note for its grand scenery, unusual geology, rare plant and animal species.

Location and access
There are parking areas at the east and west end of the property, and trails provide access into and through the site.

Description
Rising 150-200 feet (45-60 m) above the low terrace of Green Bay, the steep carbonate cliffs and outcrops support numerous rare land snails including the cherrystone drop snail (Hendersonia occulta), a state-threatened species. Aspen, sugar maple, red oak, hemlock, and white cedar grow out of the talus affording complete shade to the escarpment maintaining the cool and damp conditions, which support a lush growth of mosses.

The unique site conditions also support such uncommon species as climbing fumitory, mountain maple, bulblet fern, common polypody, and fragile fern. Above the escarpment is a dry-mesic forest of red and white pine with red oak. The ground layer is dominated by round-leaved dogwood with northern bush honeysuckle, zig-zag goldenrod, big-leaved aster, and bracken fern. The site slowly grades into a richer, more mesic forest containing sugar maple, beech, and red oak with hemlock, and white pine. Also present is a wet-mesic forest of white cedar, big-tooth aspen, and black ash. Several white cedars reach impressive sizes here. Below the escarpment are seasonally flooded forests dominated by silver maple, and green ash with swamp white oak, American bladdernut, and great water-leaf.

The site contains many rare plants including dwarf lake iris (Iris lacustris). Other noteworthy species within the SNA are variegated horsetail (Equisetum variegatum), Hooker's orchid (Platanthera hookeri), long-spurred violet (Viola rostrata), and large-flowered ground-cherry (Leucophysalis grandiflora).

Rare animals include red-shouldered hawk (Buteo lineatus), Midwest Pleistocene vertigo (Vertigo hubrichti), Iowa Pleistocene vertigo (V. iowaensis) and Four-toed salamander (Hemidactylium scutatum). Significant portions of the Bayshore Blufflands are owned by the Door County Land Trust.

Gallery

References

External links
Bayshore Blufflands State Natural Area
Bayshore Blufflands Preserve
Door County Land Trust

Niagara Escarpment
Protected areas established in 2002
Protected areas of Door County, Wisconsin
State Natural Areas of Wisconsin
2002 establishments in Wisconsin